The New York Theological Seminary (NYTS) is a private non-denominational Christian seminary in New York City. It was founded in 1900 as the Bible Teacher's College.

In 2019, Rev. LaKeesha Walrond was appointed as the first woman and the first African American woman president of New York Theological Seminary.

History
New York Theological Seminary began its life in 1900 as the Bible Teacher's College in Montclair, New Jersey. Under the direction of its founder, Wilbert Webster White, the school sought to intentionally bridge the divide that had then begun to open between university-based and Bible school forms of theological education. White was a leading proponent of what was known as "the inductive Bible study method". He believed that the Bible ought to be taught in English and allowed to occupy the central position in the theological curriculum. The method lent itself easily to an emphasis on practical training for ministry, which characterized the institution from its inception.

White moved the school to New York City in 1902 in order to provide what he called a more "cosmopolitan" setting for the ministerial training of students, renaming it the Bible Teachers’ Training School. In 1921, the corporate name was changed to The Biblical Seminary in New York, and then, in 1965, to New York Theological Seminary.

In the early 1970s, NYTS, under the leadership of theological educator, George W. Webber, began targeting educational programs for students in the greater New York metropolitan area who were already in ministry, were bi-vocational, or were contemplating a shift from a secular to a religious vocation. The seminary sold its campus and relocated to more affordable space and began offering its programs at nights or on weekends when urban church leaders who worked full-time could attend. For several years it suspended the granting of the M.Div. degree and focused on offering the STM degree, a newly formed Certificate in Christian Ministry, and continuing education opportunities for urban church leaders. In the mid-1970s, the seminary added the MPS and D.Min. degree programs. In the early 1980s it began to offer the M.Div. degree again, and began a master's degree program inside Sing Sing Correctional Facility that trains inmates from throughout the New York State prison system for ministry within the system. In the 1990s, the curriculum was modified to reflect the seminary's commitment to social and community analysis and the increasingly multicultural urban context. In 2002, the seminary moved to the Morningside Heights area of Manhattan. It has offices in The Interchurch Center, classrooms in the Riverside Church, and access to the Columbia University Library System, which includes the Burke Library at Union Theological Seminary.

Academics
NYTS is accredited by New York State and the Association of Theological Schools in the United States and Canada. The seminary currently offers six accredited degrees: Master of Divinity (M.Div.), Master of Arts (MA) in Pastoral Care and Counseling, Master of Arts in Religious Education (MRE), Master of Arts in Religious Leadership and Administration, Master of Arts in Youth Ministry, and Doctor of Ministry (D.Min.). Two non-accredited programs are also currently offered: a Certificate in Christian Ministry and a Clinical Pastoral Education program that is accredited by the Association for Clinical Pastoral Education through a satellite contract with Norwalk Hospital. It also offers an ATS accredited Master of Professional Studies to selected inmates in Sing Sing Correctional Facility.

Centers
The Center for the Study and Practice of Urban Religion (CSPUR), formerly the Ecologies of Learning Project (EOL), is a research and action center based at New York Theological Seminary. NYTS received a grant in 2004 for the Ecologies of Learning project, founded by former professor of Urban Studies and Religion Lowell Livezey, which developed into the Center for the Study and Practice of Urban Religion (CSPUR) in 2009.

The Center for World Christianity was established in 2004 with the support of the Henry Luce Foundation.

Notable alumni
 
 David Benke, former president of the Atlantic District of the Lutheran Church–Missouri Synod
 Eleanor Moody-Shepherd (M.Div.), Dean of Students at New York Theological Seminary
 Eugene Peterson, religious commentator, author of multiple books and paraphraser of The Message translation of the Bible
 Sanco Rembert, Anglican bishop, first African-American bishop of the Reformed Episcopal Church
 Pat Robertson, American religious broadcaster

References

External links
 Official website

Universities and colleges in New York City
Seminaries and theological colleges in New York City
Upper West Side
Universities and colleges in Manhattan
Educational institutions established in 1900
1902 establishments in New York City
1900 establishments in New Jersey